David Hanna may refer to:

 David Blyth Hanna (1858–1938), Canadian railway executive
 David C. Hanna (born 1941), British physicist
 David John Hanna (1866–1946), American politician
 David Hanna (writer) (1917–1993), American author and entertainment journalist 
 David Hanna (artist) (1941–1981), American artist
 David Hanna (historian) (born 1967), American military historian and son of the above artist.